The Jeanneau Yachts 58, also called the Jeanneau 58, is a French sailboat with a hull that was designed by Philippe Briand, the interior and deck by Camillo Garroni and finishing by JF de Premorel, with structure by the Jeanneau Design Office. It was intended as a blue water cruiser and was first built in 2016.

Production
The design was built by Jeanneau in France, starting in 2016, but it is now out of production.

Design
The Jeanneau Yachts 58 is a recreational keelboat, built predominantly of fiberglass, with wood trim. It has a fractional sloop rig, with a keel-stepped mast, three sets of swept spreaders and aluminum spars with discontinuous Dyform rigging. The hull has a nearly-plumb stem, a reverse transom with steps and a swimming platform, an internally mounted spade-type controlled by dual wheels and an "L"-shaped fixed fin keel with weighted bulb or optional shoal-draft keel. The fin keel model displaces  empty and carries  of cast iron ballast, while the shoal draft version displaces  empty and carries  of cast iron ballast.

The design was built with a number of interior arrangements with three or four cabins and sleeping accommodation for five to nine people. One typical three-cabin arrangement has a "skipper cabin" in the bow with a single berth, a large forward cabin with a double island berth and a large aft cabin with a double island berth. The main salon has a "U"-shaped settee, individual chairs and a straight settee. The galley is located on the port side just forward of the companionway ladder. The galley is "J"-shaped and is equipped with a four-burner stove, a refrigerator, freezer and a double sink. A navigation station is opposite the galley, on the starboard side. In this arrangement that are three heads, one in each cabin, although as many as four heads may be installed. Cabin maximum headroom is .There is also a dinghy garage under the cockpit.

Operational history
In a 2017 review for Cruising World Mark Pillsbury wrote, "We sailed the 58 on a moderate Chesapeake Bay afternoon in about 8 knots of breeze with slightly higher puffs, and like all Briand hulls, she was quick and a joy to drive, topping off at more than 6 knots hard on the breeze. Once out of the cockpit, moving about on deck was particularly easy and rewarding: There are good, high lifelines; excellent stainless-­steel handholds built into the sloping coach roof; and with well-placed inboard shrouds, moving forward on the teak side decks, even with the overlapping headsail, was a breeze."

See also
List of sailing boat types

References

External links

Keelboats
2010s sailboat type designs
Sailing yachts
Sailboat type designs by Philippe Briand
Sailboat type designs by Jeanneau Design Office
Sailboat type designs by Camillo Garroni
Sailboat type designs by JF de Premorel
Sailboat types built by Jeanneau